Mike McGuire in an American college baseball coach and former catcher. He is the head baseball coach at the University of South Carolina Upstate. McGuire played college baseball at the University of Akron from 1990 to 1991 and the University of South Carolina from 1992 to 1993 and played semi-professionally in the Frontier League from 1993 to 1994. He served as head coach of the Morehead State Eagles baseball program from 2013 season to 2019.

Playing career
McGuire played two seasons for Akron before completing his eligibility at South Carolina.  He then played two professional seasons with the Independent Zanesville Greys of the Frontier League.

Coaching career
McGuire began coaching as an assistant for two seasons at Morehead State.  He then moved to Winthrop for six seasons.  McGuire earned his first head coaching job at Division II Lander.  After three seasons with the Bearcats, he returned to Winthrop as Associate Head Coach.  After six seasons, he earned another head coaching position at Louisburg, a junior college in North Carolina.  After one season, McGuire was hired as head coach at Morehead State.

On June 18, 2019, McGuire left Morehead State to become the head coach for the USC Upstate Spartans baseball program.

Head coaching record
This table shows McGuire's record as a head coach at the Division I, Division II , and NJCAA level.

See also
List of current NCAA Division I baseball coaches

References

External links
USC Upstate Spartans bio

Living people
Akron Zips baseball players
Lander Bearcats baseball coaches
Louisburg Hurricanes baseball coaches
Morehead State Eagles baseball coaches
South Carolina Gamecocks baseball players
Winthrop Eagles baseball coaches
USC Upstate Spartans baseball coaches
Year of birth missing (living people)
Zanesville Greys players
Baseball catchers
Morehead State University alumni